James is a 2022 Indian Kannada-language action drama film written and directed by Chethan Kumar. It stars Puneeth Rajkumar and Priya Anand. This is Puneeth's posthumous appearance following his death on 29 October 2021. The film marked the second collaboration between Puneeth, Priya and Sarathkumar after Raajakumara (2017). The film score and soundtrack are composed by V. Harikrishna and Charan Raj, respectively.

The movie had a theatrical release on 17 March 2022 on the occasion of Puneeth Rajkumar's birthday. The film was considered it as a fitting tribute to Puneeth Rajkumar by the audience. and became a blockbuster at the box office and broke the record for the biggest opening day collections for any Kannada film by grossing around ₹28 crore to ₹32 crore on the first day. On the 4th day of its release, it also recorded the highest single day footfalls for a Kannada movie. The film grossed ₹100 crores within 4 days of release and became the second highest-grossing Kannada film at the time of release whilst also becoming the fastest Kannada film to gross ₹100 crores at the box office at that time only to be surpassed by K.G.F: Chapter 2 in less than a month.

Plot 
The crime syndicate which is operating in Bangalore is divided into three groups namely the Golden Horse syndicate owned by Joseph Anthony who is driving from Miami, Scorpion syndicate owned by Rathanlal is operating from West Bengal and Gayakwad Syndicate owned by Jayadev Gayakwad and his son Vijay Gayakwad are operating in Bangalore. Vijay Gayakwad is embroiled in a life-threatening situation when unknown assailants sent by Joseph murdered Jayadev. Joseph had learned from an informer that Vijay was the one who killed his brothers John, Peter, and Robin and also sent his son Vicky into a coma.

After realizing that his family is also in danger, Vijay appoints Santhosh Kumar, who is the manager of J-Wings security agency, as his bodyguard due to his skills and tactics in handling his assignments. Santhosh helps Vijay in his business dealings, while also having Rathanlal killed when he tries to conquer the Gayakwad Syndicate. Vijay then requests Santhosh to protect his sister Nisha Gayakwad, who has returned to India after completing her medical studies from Singapore. After an attack, Santhosh and Nisha escape to a village in Madikeri, where Nisha falls for Santhosh. She requests Vijay to accept their relationship, Though reluctant at first, Vijay accepts. At the party, Vijay announces his decision to hand over his business dealings to Nisha, who also introduces Santhosh. 

At this point, Santhosh asks Vijay whether he fears anything in his life, only to start a shootout where he kills his other bodyguards and reveals that he was the one who had Jayadev assassinated so that Vijay could hire him. At the same time, Joseph's hitmen barge into the party and are shocked to find Santhosh, who they recognize as "James", their nemesis who was presumed dead. One of them informs this Joseph, before getting beheaded by Santhosh. Joseph learns that the informer had lied to Vijay about his brother's death and kills him (as the informer wants to seek vengeance on Joseph for killing his friends earlier). Santhosh brings Vijay and Nisha to the security agency's interrogation room. When Nisha insults Santhosh, Santhosh's colleague Rakesh Kumar Pirangi reveals Santhosh's past. 

Past: 10 months ago, Santhosh is an Indian Army Major in Kashmir, who arrives at Pondicherry with Rakesh for his IAS officer friend Ekanth's wedding, and they meet Santhosh's friends Jagan, Amar, Madan, who are also working in various Government departments. At the wedding, Jagan reveals to Santhosh that when he took charge as NCB officer, he had arrested John, Robin, and Peter for smuggling, led by the Golden Horse Syndicate. Under Vijay and Joseph's advice, John, Peter, and Robin barge in and kill everyone present at the wedding. Santhosh, who survives due to Rakesh's help, leaves for Miami as James.

Santhosh drags Robin from his birthday party and kills him. Later, he tracks Peter at his Miami island where he decapitates him and lures John into his drug lab, and brutally finishes him. Santhosh returns to India by faking his death and is detained by his higher officer, but Santhosh seeks his higher official's approval to destroy the syndicates, to which they agree and their secret mission – "MISSION NORC" is launched where he arrives at Bangalore and started planning to bring down the syndicate with the help of his squad officers by opening J-Wings agency. 

Present: Vijay escapes from the agency with Joseph's help. Santhosh, with Nisha's help, lures Joseph, Vijay, and his gang into Sangihe Islands where the squad officers arrest the syndicate members. The film ends with Santhosh saluting the Indian flag with the satisfaction of having accomplished his friend's mission.

Cast 

 Puneeth Rajkumar as Santhosh Kumar/James (voiceover by Shiva Rajkumar)
 Priya Anand as Nisha Gayakwad
 Anu Prabhakar as Vijay Gayakwad's wife
 Srikanth as Vijay Gayakwad 
 R. Sarathkumar as Joseph Antony
 Madhusudhan Rao as Jayadev Gakaywad, Vijay Gayakwad's father
 Mukesh Rishi as Rathanlal, Supporter of Joseph Antony 
 Aditya Menon as Prathap Aras, Associate of Vijay Gayakwad
 Rangayana Raghu as Rakesh Kumar Pirangi, Santhosh's colleague
 Avinash as Higher army officer of Santosh
 Sadhu Kokila as Santhosh's assistant
 Tilak Shekar as Jagan, ATS officer 
 Gajapade Harsha as ACP Amar,
 Chikkanna as Madan, Chief editor of Janadani newspaper
 Shine Shetty as Ekanth, IAS officer 
 Suchendra Prasad as Jessie's father
 Padmaja Rao as Mary, Jessie's mother
 Ketan Karande as gang member of Joseph Antony's mafia syndicate
 Mohan Juneja as a rich person in hospital
 Girish as a fake rich person
 Prasanna Baagin as Rathanlal's son
 Vajragiri as Rathanlal's son
 John Kokken as John, Joseph's brother
 Taarak Ponnappa as Peter, Joseph's brother
 Yash Shetty as Robin, Joseph's brother 
 Vajrang Shetty as Prathap Aras' Son
 Kavya Shastry as Jagan's wife
 Hamsa as Amar's wife 
 Nayana Gowda as Madan's wife 
 Sameeksha as Jessie, Ekanth's fiancée
 Shivamani as Joseph's associate 
 Anil as Vijay Gaikwad's associate
 Krishna Hebbale as a police officer
 K S Shreedhar as orphanage head
 Amit as Santhosh's associate in the agency
 Baby Aradhya Chandra as Amar's daughter 
 Master Anoop as Jagan's son
 Govindegowda as marriage broker
 Swapna as Dechamma
 Sillilalli Anand as the guy at ashram
 All Ok as the rich kid at the bar
 Dattanna as Chowdhury (cameo) 
 Shiva Rajkumar in a cameo appearance as Anandraj, a soldier
 Raghavendra Rajkumar in a cameo appearance as Santhosh's orphanage head 

Additionally, Charanraj , Chandan Shetty, Rachita Ram, Ashika Ranganath and Sreeleela appears as themselves in a cameo appearance in the Trademark song.

Production 
Prior to his demise, Puneeth had finished most part of the shoot except one song and voice dubbing. The movie team tried its best to retain Puneeth's voice captured during shoot but when it seemed difficult, Shiva Rajkumar, the eldest brother of Puneeth, dubbed for his brother's character in the Kannada version.

Casting 
Priya Anand was signed for the female lead role. The makers also announced that Srikanth, Hareesh Peradi, Mukesh Rishi and Anu Prabhakar would be seen in prominent roles. In 2021, R. Sarathkumar, Tilak Shekar, Shine Shetty, Chikkanna joined the film's cast.

Filming

The film is produced by Kishore Pathikonda under the banner Kishore Productions. The first schedule of the shoot started from 19 January 2020 in Bengaluru. The second schedule of the film started from 14 October 2020 in Hampi.
A quick schedule was also wrapped in February 2021 in Kashmir featuring important action sequences of Puneeth Rajkumar. After returning from Kashmir, Puneeth became busy in the promotional activities of his other film, Yuvarathnaa which released on 1 April amidst the second wave of the COVID-19 pandemic. The James team resumed shoot once again from 5 July at a brisk pace after the Government of Karnataka gave nod to restart filming activities.

Music 
Charan Raj composed the music for the film. Vijeth Krishna composed "Bolo Bolo James".

Release

Theatrical
The film released in theatres on 17 March 2022 in Kannada alongside dubbed versions in Hindi, Malayalam, Tamil, and Telugu. It released in 4000 screens on the first day including 400 single screen theaters in Karnataka alone and 900 shows in multiplexes making it the biggest release at that time in Karnataka. The Telugu film RRR had postponed its release by one week due to release of this film.

Re-release
On 18 April 2022, Chethan Kumar announced that a Hyderabad-based team was able to recreate Puneeth's voice using Shivrajkumar's modulation and Puneeth's voice samples from his previous films and hosting endeavors. Kumar announced that consequently James would be re-released in theaters with the new voice on 22 April 2022.

Home media
The film was released on SonyLIV on 14 April 2022 in Kannada, Telugu, Tamil, Malayalam and Hindi and the satellite rights of the Kannada version were sold to Star Suvarna.

Reception

Box office
The movie was estimated to have grossed ₹28 to ₹32 crores on its first day which was the highest opening day domestic box office collections for a Kannada film at that time. It was reported to have grossed  crore from Bengaluru alone – marking it the first time a movie has grossed above  crore in the city on its opening day. The net collections at the end of the first day was reported to be around  18 crores to ₹22.5 crores.

It was reported to have grossed ₹10 crores on the second day with the total gross around  37 crores to ₹45 crores in 2 days. It was speculated that the gross theatrical collections for 3 days to be around  54 crores with a net collections of  38 crores for the same period. The net collections for 4 days was reported to be around ₹50 crores. Multiple media outlets reported that the movie had grossed ₹100 crores within 4 days The movie grossed more than ₹125
crores at the box office within 6 days of its release. The movie grossed ₹151 crores at the box office.

Critical response
James received positive reviews from critics and audience.

The Times of India gave the movie 4 out of 5 rating and praised the movie for its stylish presentation. Deccan Herald praised the movie for its high octane slick action sequences. Firstpost said the movie is "impressively shot and edited" and praised the production values and noted that the sets are "classy and pristine". The News Minute praised the "visual effects and smart camera angles".  India Today gave the film a rating of 3 out of 5 and praised Puneeth's performance "from enacting emotional sequences to nailing difficult dance steps ". The Hans India noted that gave a rating of 2.5 out of 5 "Director Chetan Kumar has done a passable job with the film. Though he chooses a routine story, he packed it with good mass elements and showcased Puneeth Raj Kumar in the best way possible. Music by Charan Raj is very good but his BGM was even more effective. The production values are top-notch and the rich visuals impress. The action part needs a special mention as all the fights are done superbly". The Indian Express noted that "one cannot escape the strong sense of melancholy that comes with the knowledge of the fact that it will be the last time one would see Puneeth on-screen".

See also 
 List of highest-grossing Kannada films

References

External links
 

2022 films
2020s Kannada-language films
Films shot in Bangalore
Films scored by V. Harikrishna
Films shot in Karnataka
Film productions suspended due to the COVID-19 pandemic
Indian action drama films